William John Keating (March 30, 1927 – May 20, 2020) was an American lawyer, businessman and politician of the Republican party. He served in the United States House of Representatives from 1971 to 1974.

Keating was born in Cincinnati, Ohio, the son of Adele (née Kipp) and Charles Humphrey Keating. Keating graduated from St. Xavier High School and then served in the United States Navy during World War II. He received his bachelor's degree from University of Cincinnati and his law degree from University of Cincinnati College of Law.

Keating was an assistant Ohio Attorney General. He was admitted to the Ohio bar. He served as Cincinnati Municipal Court judge and then served as judge of the Hamilton County, Ohio Court of Common Pleas from 1964-67. From 1967-70, he served on the Cincinnati City Council.

Keating served in the United States House of Representatives from 1971–74, representing Ohio's 1st congressional district. Keating resigned from Congress to become President and CEO of The Cincinnati Enquirer.

Keating was a founding member of the law firm Keating, Muething and Klekamp. He was awarded honorary degrees from the University of Cincinnati (LLD & DHL), Xavier University (LLD), and the College of Mount St Joseph (DHL).

Keating was CEO of the Detroit Newspaper Partnership, a joint operation of The Detroit News and the Detroit Free Press. He served as chairman of the board of the Associated Press. He was president of the Newspaper Division of Gannett Company, Inc. Keating died on May 20, 2020.

Keating was heavily involved in the sport of swimming and is a member of the athletic Halls of Fame at St Xavier High School – where he graduated in 1945 – and the University of Cincinnati for his accomplishments, as are his brother Charles H. Keating Jr. (St Xavier and UC), son Bill (St Xavier and UC) and nephew Charles Keating III (St Xavier and Indiana University).

References

Sources

1927 births
2020 deaths
20th-century American businesspeople
21st-century American businesspeople
American publishing chief executives
American law firm executives
American newspaper publishers (people)
Lawyers from Cincinnati
Cincinnati City Council members
Ohio state court judges
Politicians from Cincinnati
Military personnel from Cincinnati
St. Xavier High School (Ohio) alumni
University of Cincinnati alumni
University of Cincinnati College of Law alumni
Keating family
The Cincinnati Enquirer people
Republican Party members of the United States House of Representatives from Ohio